Mohammed Aïssaoui (born 1964, Algiers) is a French writer and journalist. He is currently working for Le Figaro littéraire.

Works 
2006: .
2010: .
 Prix Renaudot de l'essai 2010.
 Prix RFO du livre 2010.
2012: .
2014: Petit éloge des souvenirs,  Gallimard, 128 p. 
2015: .

Theatrical adaptation 

References

External links 
 Mohammed Aïssaoui : le joli devoir de mémoire on Le Figaro (28 August 2014)
 Mohammed Aïssaoui on Babelio
 L'Affaire de l'esclave Furcy - Mohammed Aïssaoui on YouTube

21st-century French writers
21st-century French essayists
21st-century French journalists
Prix Renaudot de l'essai winners
People from Algiers
1964 births
Living people
Le Figaro people